Treatises are written discourses.

Treatise or variation, may also refer to:

Discourses
Classes of treatises
 Tract (literature)
 Monograph
 Essay

Types of treatises
 Learned treatise
 Legal treatise
 Military treatise
 Political treatise

Other uses
 Treatise (music), a 1960s musical composition by Cornelius Cardew
 The Treatise (Walter of Bibbesworth), a 13th-century Anglo-Norman poem by Walter of Bibbesworth

See also

 Treatise on money (disambiguation)
 
 Essay (disambiguation)
 Tract (disambiguation)
 Treaties
 Treaty (disambiguation)